CGP 52608 is a selective ligand of the RAR-related orphan receptor alpha. It has been used as a biochemical tool to investigate nuclear and membrane signaling of melatonin.  CGP 52608 has also been reported to possess antiarthritic activity. The pharmaceutical company Novartis brought it to clinical trials for rheumatoid arthritis, but development was discontinued in 2006.

CGP 52608 contains a thiazolinidinedione group.

References

External links
 

Thioureas
Thiazolidines
Allyl compounds
Lactams